Eupomatia bennettii, commonly named small bolwarra, is a species of shrubs of the Australian continent ancient plant family Eupomatiaceae, found in sub-tropical rainforest in eastern Australia. They grow naturally north from the Nambucca River and are sometimes found in moist gullies dominated by Eucalyptus trees.

Usually seen from 70 cm to 140 cm high. Leaves are hairless, reverse lanceolate in shape, 8 to 20 cm long, 2.5 to 5 cm wide.

Attractive cream and red flowers form in spring, 25 mm in diameter. The fruit is an obconical berry; starting green then turning a yellowish colour. 2 to 3 cm in diameter.

References

Magnoliales
Magnoliids of Australia
Flora of Queensland
Flora of New South Wales
Taxa named by Ferdinand von Mueller